Patrick Horvath is an American film producer, writer and director. His films include Entrance, The Pact 2 and Southbound.

Filmography

References

External links 
 

Year of birth missing (living people)
Living people
American film directors
American film producers
21st-century American writers